Zuccoli may refer to:

 Zuccoli, Northern Territory, a relatively new suburb in the City of Palmerston, Northern Territory, Australia, located to the south-west of Palmerston City. Its postal
 Giorgio Zuccoli, Italian former yacht racer who competed in the 1988 Summer Olympics and in the 1992 Summer Olympics
 Luigi Zuccoli, Italian painter